Franco Coladipietro is currently the Village President in Bloomingdale, Illinois and previously served as a Republican member of the Illinois House of Representatives representing Illinois' 45th House District. In 2006 Coladipietro unseated Republican incumbent Roger Jenisch in the Republican Primary, and went on to defeat Democrat Rob Bisceglie in the general election. He was elected to three terms in the Illinois House of Representatives and served as the minority spokesman for the Financial Institutions Committee and as a member of the Legislative Ethics Commission. Coladipietro chose not to run for re-election in 2012, and instead successfully ran for Bloomingdale Village President in 2013, unseating 20-year incumbent Robert Iden.

Coladipietro is a partner with the law firm of Amari & Locallo. He practices exclusively in the area of property tax assessment matters on a nationwide basis.  His representative client base includes national REITs, property management firms and commercial and industrial property owners.  Coladipietro holds a Juris Doctor from John Marshall Law School and served as a Staff Editor for The John Marshall Law Review.

Professional Awards/Recognition

"2018 Governmental Leader of the Year", DuPage Mayors and Managers Conference; "Today’s Young Executive Award, The Business Ledger, 2005 
"Top Forty Lawyers under Forty", Law Bulletin Publishing Company, 2003 
Young Lawyer of the Year, Illinois State Bar Association, 2004 
Rookie of the Year, Bloomingdale Chamber of Commerce, 2004 
Alumni Distinguished Service Award, The John Marshall Law School, 2004 
Guest Appearance, CNNfn "Your Money", Real Estate Taxation, 2004 
Board of Governors Award, Illinois State Bar Association, 2003 
Community Service Award, Illinois State Bar Association, 2000

Electoral history
2006 45th Legislative District Republican Primary
Franco Coladipietro 53.2%
Roger Jenisch 46.8%
2006 45th Legislative District General Election
Franco Coladipietro (R) 57.1%
Rob Bisceglie (D) 42.8%
2013 Consolidated Election-Village President
Franco Coladipietro (I) 52.92%
Robert Iden 47.08%

References

External links
Franco Coladipietro - Attorney Bio at Amari & Locallo
Franco Coladipietro's Official Website
Illinois General Assembly - Representative Franco Coladipietro (R) 45th District official IL House website
Bills Committees
Project Vote Smart - Representative Franco Coladipietro (IL) profile
Follow the Money - Franco Coladipietro
2006 campaign contributions
Illinois House Republican Caucus - Franco Coladipietro profile

Members of the Illinois House of Representatives
Living people
1968 births
21st-century American politicians
People from Bloomingdale, Illinois